Michael O'Keefe (born 1955) is an American film and television actor.

Michael O'Keefe or O'Keeffe may also refer to;

Michael A. O'Keefe (born 1942), Australian physicist
Michael Kenny O'Keefe (born 1963), American judge on the D.C. Superior Court
Michael O'Keeffe (footballer) (born 1990), New Zealand footballer
Michael O'Keeffe (chemist) (born 1934), American crystallographer
Michael O'Keefe (Tasmanian politician) (1864–1926), Australian politician in Tasmania
Michael O'Keefe (Louisiana politician) (1932–2021), American politician in Louisiana
Michael O'Keeffe (Queensland politician) (1854–1941), Australian politician in Queensland

See also
Miles O'Keeffe (born 1954), American movie star of the 1980s
Michael Edwin Keefe (1844–1933), Nova Scotia politician
Michael Keith (disambiguation)